The Roman Catholic Diocese of Khunti is a diocese located in the city of Khunti in the Ecclesiastical province of Ranchi in India.

History
 1 April 1995: Established as Diocese of Khunti from the Metropolitan Archdiocese of Ranchi

Leadership
 Bishops of Khunti (Latin Rite)
 Bishop Binay Kandulna (30 November 2012 – present)
 Bishop Stephen M. Tiru (1 April 1995 – 3 March 2012)

References

External links
 GCatholic.org 
 Catholic Hierarchy 

Roman Catholic dioceses in India
Christian organizations established in 1995
Roman Catholic dioceses and prelatures established in the 20th century
Christianity in Jharkhand
1995 establishments in Bihar
Khunti district